Gulf Bridge International (GBI) is the Middle East's first privately owned submarine cable system linking the countries bordering the Persian Gulf on a self-healing ring to each other and onward to Europe, Africa and Asia. Gulf Bridge International (GBI), both owns and operates this submarine cable asset as a carrier's carrier as well as offering a full suite of wholesale transmission, IP capacity options, and Enterprise Services. Its main headquarters are located at the Qatar Science & Technology Park in Doha, Qatar.

It includes a mix of submarine cables systems and terrestrial infrastructure, with investments in 9 major subsea cable systems with 9 points-of-presence (PoPs) and 17 cable landings between London and Singapore and offers scalable bandwidth options up to 100G with a design capacity of up to five terabits per second.

History
Incorporated in December 2008, GBI started production and deployment of the 'Gulf Ring' – a "high speed, subsea cable system" connecting the countries overlooking on Persian Gulf together and integrated into the larger GBI Cable System (GBICS) which has onward East and West links to Europe, Africa and Asia. The high capacity demand from the Middle East and lack of diversity/resilience (as witnessed by the cable outages of 2008.) were large driving factors for the establishment of GBI.

2019–present 
In June 2019, Gulf Bridge International partnered with Nokia to deliver multi-national SDWAN in the Middle East with Nuage Networks.

In November 2019, GBI and Batelco strengthened their partnership to deliver accelerated connectivity between Bahrain and Europe.

In November 2019, GBI and Microsoft signed a Memorandum of Understanding (MoU) that supported cloud adoption in the Middle Eastern Region.

In January 2021, GBI participated in the launch of Qatar's first Internet Exchange Point.

In June 2021, GBI expanded its Versa Networks partnership by joining the Versa ACE Partner Program.

In August 2021, GBI expanded its partnership with Equinix to enhance connectivity via Oman data centre.

Market growth
Between 2005 and 2010 the Middle East was the fastest growing region globally in terms of demand for bandwidth and capacity usage. This demand is forecast to double every three years over the course of the next decade, being driven by several factors:
 Opening up of the regional telecom markets to competition which has stimulated an unprecedented increase in the use of mobile and broadband internet services.
 Government initiatives around the Persian Gulf to lessen dependence on carbon based industries and diversify their investments to include other sectors, have increased the demand for superior levels of international connectivity from sectors such as Finance and Media.
In the member states of the Gulf Cooperation Council (GCC), the estimated number of individuals using internet grew at a CAGR of 8% from 38 million in 2014 to 56 million in 2019, while in the same period, the use of international bandwidth increased at a CAGR of 46%, which indicates the rising user demand for more capacity. Fulfilling this expanding flow in cross-border data are currently more than 30 undersea cables in service in the Middle East and North Africa (MENA) region, and more than 390 globally.

The number of submarine cables per country varies considerably across different economies in the Gulf, depending on the size and population of the country, but all members states of the GCC are currently connected with at least four international submarine cables. UAE is currently connected to 16 cables, while Saudi Arabia and Oman have 12 cables. Bahrain, Kuwait and Qatar, the three smaller and less populous member states of the GCC, have fewer cables landing on their coasts: four cables landing in Bahrain and Kuwait, and six in Qatar.

The number of landing points in the GCC is expected to increase in the next 5 years as new subsea cables are under construction. For example, one more subsea cable will land in UAE and Oman (Africa-1 by the end of 2023 and 2Africa in 2023/2024, respectively), while two more will land in Saudi Arabia.

The access to high-quality, reliable connectivity is critical for fostering economic development as supports the development of data centre industries, facilitates improvements in mobile and fixed technology and increases data consumption, which in turn drive significant revenue. For example, according to a GSMA study,[1] mobile technologies and services accounted for 5.7% of MENA's GDP in 2019, or US$244 billion. The mobile industry in MENA also supported almost a million jobs (directly and indirectly) and contributed to the funding of the public sector, with almost US$20 billion raised through taxation in 2019.

Present
Since its establishment, the business has been validated, both by the participation of new regional investors and telecom operators looking for a new business model; and the infrastructure to enable them to provide new applications and services.

GBI currently has presence in:
 Qatar
 United Arab EmiratesDubai and Fujairah
 Iran
 IraqThis was a major first by GBI, as it placed the first ever submarine cable connecting Iraq to the world.

 Kuwait
 Bahrain
 Oman

 Saudi Arabia
 ItalyMilan
 IndiaMumbai and Chennai
Singapore
United KingdomLondon
FranceMarseille and Paris
GermanyFrankfurt
NetherlandsAmsterdam

Products
GBI products include a full suite of wholesale transmission, IP capacity options, and enterprise services including:

WDM and transmission capacity services:

 Synchronous Digital Hierarchy: IPLC products STM1 to STM64
 Wavelength-division multiplexing: wavelengths at 10 and 100 Gbit/s
 Ethernet over SDH: EPL Products from 0.1 to 10 Gbit/s	

Packet-based IP/MPLS services:

 IP Transit: at neutral GCC data centres, Europe and Singapore from 0.1 to 10 Gbit/s	
 Content-Transit: to specific desired content from 1 to 10 Gbit/s
 Ethernet over MPLS: backbone services across neutral data centres in GCC, Europe and Singapore from 0.1 to 10 Gbit/s

Managed connectivity services:

 Global VPNs: from 1 Mbit/s global corporate WAN Layer 2 and 3 services over MPLS or SD-WAN technologies
 Cloud-Connect: from 10 Mbit/s global Private and Public cloud connectivity (AWS, Azure, Oracle, SAP, etc.) over MPLS or SD-WAN technologies
IX-Connect: from 1 to 10 Gbit/s for remote peering at desired Internet Exchange worldwide
Content-Connect: from 1 Gbit/s to 100 Gbit/s to major contents in the GCC and Europe.
Managed Hosting: for the media and gaming industries consisting of IaaS or co-location and connectivity services at GCC neutral data centres

Awards
 2012 Best Niche/New Player - Capacity Europe
 2012 Best Technology Investment - CommsMEA

References

External links
 

Submarine communications cables in the Indian Ocean
Telecommunications companies established in 2008
Submarine communications cables in the Arabian Sea
Submarine communications cables in the Mediterranean Sea
Submarine communications cables in the English Channel
Submarine communications cables in the North Sea
Submarine communications cables in the North Atlantic Ocean
2008 establishments in Maharashtra
2008 establishments in Tamil Nadu
Telecommunications in India